The 12121 / 12122 Madhya Pradesh Sampark Kranti Express, is one of the trains among Sampark Kranti Express trains introduced in the 2005 Indian Railway Budget. The train was announced between Jabalpur (in Madhya Pradesh) and New Delhi. This train presently terminates at Hazrat Nizamuddin railway station in Delhi which is located  approximately to south of New Delhi railway station.

Madhya Pradesh Sampark Kranti Express, is organized by the West Central Railway (पश्चिम मध्य रेल) (IR code:-प.म.रे/WCR ) a unit of Indian Railways(भारतीय रेल) and owned by Jabalpur railway division. It is now changed from ICF to LHB coach.

Times

Route & halts

Traction
Both trains are hauled by an Itarsi Loco Shed-based WAP-7 (HOG)-equipped locomotive from end to end.

Coach info.
The train consists of total 22 coaches as follows:
 1 AC-I Tier car
 2 AC-II Tier cars
 6 AC-III Tier cars
 4 General coaches
 7 Sleeper cars
 1 Eog 
 1 Divyang Cum Luggage Cum Gard Coach

Average speed
The train runs with an average speed of 75 km/h.

Alternative trains for Jabalpur and New Delhi
Mahakoshal Express by West Central Railway
Gondwana Express by Northern Railways
Jammu Tawi–Jabalpur Express a weekly by West Central Railways
Jabalpur–H.Nizamuddin Express via Itarsi on a daily basis.

See also

 Habibganj–New Delhi Shatabdi Express
 Shaan-e-Bhopal Express
 Taj Express
 Avantika Express
 Malwa Express
 Sampark Kranti Express

References
 The Hindu
 Sampark Kranti
 West Central Railways
 Hazrat Nizamuddin Sampark Kranti Jabalpur Express Timetable

Sampark Kranti Express trains
Transport in Jabalpur
Transport in Delhi
Rail transport in Uttar Pradesh
Rail transport in Madhya Pradesh
Rail transport in Delhi
Railway services introduced in 2005